Et vous, tu m'aimes ? is the debut album of French indie folk duo Brigitte.

Track list (original)
 "Battez-vous" (4:04)
 "Cœur de chewing gum" (2:45)
 "Big Bang (Au pays des Candides) (3:09)
 "Monsieur je t'aime" (2:29)
 "La Vengeance d'une louve" (3:21)
 "English Song" (2:44)
 "Je veux un enfant" (2:21)
 "Ma Benz" (4:19)
 "Oh la la" (2:59)
 "Tumbleweed" (0:13)
 "Après minuit" (2:57)
 "Quel beau dimanche" (2:44)
 "Et Claude François" (2:20)
 "Hippocampe" (0:26)
 "Jesus Sex Symbol" (2:00 empty) (7:44)
 "Encore un verre" (hidden) (2:28)
Total duration = 47:30

Track list (new edition)
 "Battez-vous" (4:04)
 "Cœur de chewing gum" (2:45)
 "Big Bang (Au pays des Candides)" (3:09)
 "Monsieur je t'aime" (2:29)
 "La Vengeance d'une louve" (3:21)
 "English Song" (2:44)
 "Je veux un enfant" (2:21)
 "Ma Benz" (4:19)
 "Oh la la" (2:59)
 "Tumbleweed" (0:13)
 "Après minuit" (2:57)
 "Quel beau dimanche" (2:44)
 "Et Claude François" (2:20)
 "Hippocampe" (0:26)
 "Jesus Sex Symbol" (5:45)
 "Ne me lâche pas" (3:16)
 "Battez-vous" (Remix) (5:07)
 "Encore un verre" (hidden) (2:27)

Charts

References

2011 debut albums
French-language albums